John Juan Mendez, who records as Silent Servant, is an American techno DJ and producer.

Born in Central America, he was brought up in Los Angeles, where he grew up listening to The Smiths, The Cure, New Order, My Bloody Valentine and Sonic Youth; and started DJing at the age of 16.

In 1999 he made contact with Regis, the founder of the Birmingham-based Downwards Records label, becoming a member of Regis's Sandwell District collective, with whom he released a series of singles throughout the 2000s. Mendez acted as Sandwell District's art director.

References

American techno musicians